Abby Abinanti is California’s first Native American female lawyer.

Abinanti was born in 1947 in San Francisco, California and she grew up on the Yurok Indian Reservation. She initially studied journalism at Humboldt State University, but then decided to enroll at the University of New Mexico School of Law. She was particularly interested in the field of Indian law and later specialized in family court proceedings and juvenile dependency due in large part to the Indian Child Welfare Act (1978).

She was called to the State Bar of California in 1974. During the course of her legal career, Abinanti had developed the first tribal program to help members with the expungement process. In the 1990s, she began serving as a Commissioner in the Unified Family Court for the San Francisco Superior Court until retiring in 2011. From 2014-2015, she served as a part-time Commissioner for San Francisco Superior Court’s dependency division.

Abinanti began serving as a Judge of the Yurok Tribal Court in 1997. Since 2007, she has served as the court’s Chief Judge.

See also 
 List of first women lawyers and judges in California
 List of Native American jurists

References 

1947 births
Living people
20th-century Native Americans
21st-century Native Americans
20th-century American judges
21st-century American judges
20th-century American lawyers
21st-century American lawyers
California lawyers
Native American judges
Native American lawyers
Yurok people
20th-century American women judges
21st-century American women judges
20th-century American women lawyers
21st-century American women lawyers
20th-century Native American women
21st-century Native American women